Ian McKerlich (born 3 January 1965) is a Canadian rower. He competed in the men's coxed pair event at the 1988 Summer Olympics.  He graduated from University of British Columbia and Harvard Business School.

References

External links
 

1965 births
Living people
Canadian male rowers
Olympic rowers of Canada
Rowers at the 1988 Summer Olympics
Rowers from Vancouver
Pan American Games medalists in rowing
Pan American Games bronze medalists for Canada
Rowers at the 1987 Pan American Games
University of British Columbia alumni
Harvard Business School alumni